Mr. Bechara is a 1996 Hindi-language romantic drama film directed by K. Bhagyaraj for producer Nandu G. Tolani, starring Nagarjuna, Sri Devi, Anil Kapoor in the pivotal roles and music composed by Anand Milind. The film is a remake of Bhagyaraj's own Tamil film Veetla Visheshanga (1994).

Plot 
Anand Verma, a widower, and father of a child admit a woman into the hospital who had lost her memory. Since he admitted her, the doctor asks him to take care of her until she recovers from amnesia. The doctor names her Asha, which is the name of Anand's late wife and makes her believe that she is married to Anand and has a child. Due to the circumstances, Anand has to accept the situation and takes her to his house. Asha insists that she does not remember any incident about her life with Anand. To make her believe it, the doctor lies to her that she has a birthmark in the part of the body only known to her husband. He also places a photograph of hers with the wedding photo of Anand. Asha yet insists that she cannot remember anything but believes that Anand is her husband and she is a mother of his child.

She starts to live with Anand as his wife, which troubles him a lot as he knows that she is not his wife. She also showers affection on the child and gets attached to it. But she discovers a situation that whatever is told to her is not true and she is neither married to Anand nor is a mother of the child. Anand tells her to leave the house, but she says she cannot leave him or his child and wants to be with them forever. Anand is convinced by everybody and finally agrees to marry her. But Asha has an unknown fear that something might stop their marriage.

On the day of marriage, Asha sees someone as a groom, which confuses everyone. The groom sings a song which jogs Asha's memory. She is actually Anita and the groom is her lover named Ajay. When they were about to marry, they were stopped by  goons because of which Anita fell from the mountain, survived with injuries, and lost her memory.

Now that her memory is back, Anand finds Ajay, brings him to Anita, and insists she marry him, as they are both lovers. Anita reluctantly accepts. When Ajay is tying the Mangal Sutra, Anita however stops him. She goes to Anand saying that he may not need her, but she needs him and the child. Seeing that motherly affection has overcome her, Ajay leaves. Anand and Anita finally get married.

Cast 

 Anil Kapoor as Anand Verma
 Sridevi as Anita/Asha Verma and wife of  Anand
 Nagarjuna as Ajay 
 Heera Rajagopal as Mrs Asha Verma (Anand's wife)
 Anupam Kher as Dr. Dayanand Surgery  face Anita Asha 
 Shakti Kapoor as Mr. Natwarlal "Romeo"
 Tiku Talsania as Inspector V. P. Chaturvedi
 Avtar Gill as Police Superintendent
 Mahavir Shah as Anita's/Asha's brother
 Shammi as Caretaker
 Rakesh Bhanushali as Dum Dum
 Pallavi
 Damini
 Manmauji
 Zain Slm as Salman
 Sonu Verma
 Yasmin
 Master Rakesh Bhanusal
 Baby Vandana
 Baby Akshay

Soundtrack 

Music was composed by Anand–Milind, while the lyrics were authored by Sameer and Nawab Arzoo. Music was released on TIME audio, which was later bought over by TIPS Audio Company.

References

External links 

1990s Hindi-language films
1996 films
Films directed by K. Bhagyaraj
Films scored by Anand–Milind
Hindi remakes of Tamil films
Films scored by Surinder Sodhi
Films about amnesia